is a Japanese footballer who plays as a defender. He was born in Tokyo, Japan but grew up in the United States, where he played several championships before turning professional in Brazil, playing for Joinville Esporte Clube.

Early life
Born in Tokyo, Japan, Umeda and his family moved to the United States when he was six years old. At the age of nine, he was spotted by Kia Zolgharnain, who helped his evolution into a professional footballer. Umeda was a Mayfield High School alumni and played NCAA Division I soccer at the University of Louisville before becoming a pro in Brazil.

Umeda played youth football in the United States. He was a member of the Internationals Soccer Club and the Cleveland Soccer Academy in Cleveland.

Club career

Joinville
In 2019, Umeda joined Joinville Esporte Clube and competed in the Brazilian Championship. He is the first-ever Asian athlete to represent Joinville.

After the 2019 season, Umeda made his debut in the Portuguese Championship. He returned to Joinville in May 2021.

Umeda became the brand ambassador for Joinville Esporte Clube and helped to benefit Joinville, according to football director Leo Roesler. The partnership intends to expand the JEC brand’s international reach in the Asian market.

Portugal
In the Campeonato de Portugal, Umeda made his debut in November 2019. He joined Pevidém in 2020 and made an appearance for their "B" team, in the Divisão de Honra AF Braga, on 11 August.

Personal life
Umeda published his first book, I'm With You, in English in 2019. He also published the book in Portuguese. Umeda promotes help to needy families while sharing football responsibilities with Joinville Esporte Clube.

Umeda became an ambassador for the United Way of Greater Cleveland in 2020, an endowment that supports low-income families and fights prejudice.

Umeda is a brand ambassador for Obsesh, which is an online platform that communicates directly with fans and supporters.

Career statistics

References

External links

 Louisville profile
 Kotaro Umeda at the Portuguese Football Federation
 Kotaro Umeda at the Brazilian Football Confederation
 

1998 births
Living people
Japanese footballers
Association football people from Tokyo
Association football defenders
Louisville Cardinals men's soccer players
Akron Zips men's soccer players
Cleveland SC players
Joinville Esporte Clube players
Pevidém S.C. players
Tormenta FC players
USL League One players
National Premier Soccer League players
Japanese expatriate footballers
Expatriate soccer players in the United States
Japanese expatriate sportspeople in the United States
Expatriate footballers in Brazil
Japanese expatriate sportspeople in Brazil
Expatriate footballers in Portugal
Japanese expatriate sportspeople in Portugal